Satiana Bunglaw is a small City in Tehsil Jaranwala District Faisalabad, Punjab, Pakistan. It is 27 km from Faisalabad, 25 km from Jaranwala and 23 km from Tandlianwala It is situated on the Tandlianwala-Faisalabad road. Cities linked via road with Satiana are:
 Faisalabad
 Tandlianwala
 Okara
 Jaranwala
 Samundri
 Dijkot
and many villages.
Chak 117 GB West is also located on Satiana Road. The people of Satiana have been demanding a public library for a long time but the government has not complied. It has Higher Secondary Schools of Boys and Girls, a Market of about 300 shops, A Govt. Hospital, Satiana Post Office (PO#37450) UNITED BANK LIMITED, Muslim Commercial Bank and Zarai Taraqiati Bank Limited New Modern Tailors, Usman Oil Mills, Police Station Satiana and NADRA registration office. Satiana is situated in constituency National Assembly 103, Provincial Assembly 102 (PP 102)

MNA NA-103 Mr. Ali Gohar
MPA PP-102 Ch Adil Parwaiz Gujjar - ch sanaUllah Gorsi Additional General Secretary PTI District Faislabad and InshaAllah next MPA of pp102 Satiana region

References

Villages in Faisalabad District